İskenderpaşa Jamia or The Community of İskenderpaşa is a branch of Naqshbandiyya-Khalidiyya Ṭarīqah (Sufi Order) in Turkey.

History
The Jamia of İskenderpaşa was first established by Mehmed Zahid Kotku (1897–1980) when he was appointed as the imam of İskender Pasha Mosque in Fatih district of Istanbul, which was constructed by the Grand Vizier Skender Pasha of Ottoman Sultan Bayezid II (reigned 1481–1512). The leader of the jamia after Kotku's death was Mahmud Esad Coşan. Then, Coşan's son Muharrem Nureddin Coşan became the leader of this jamia.

Notable members
This community has many prominent members, including current Turkish president Recep Tayyip Erdoğan.

Former Prime Ministers of Turkey
Turgut Özal, Yıldırım Akbulut, and Recep Tayyip Erdoğan.

Other politicians
Numan Kurtulmuş, Celal Adan, Korkut Özal, Hasan Celal Güzel, Fahrettin Koca, Ahmet Özal, and Muhsin Yazıcıoğlu.

References

Religious organizations based in Turkey
Naqshbandi order
Fatih